

Peter Chong Seh Jam, PBM (born 1941), is a Kyokushin karate master and a former Assistant Superintendent of Police in Singapore.

Career
Prior to studying Kyokushin karate, Chong had practised judo and was a judo instructor in the Singapore Police Force. In 1965, Chong sailed to Japan to train in Kyokushin karate under Mas Oyama, without informing either his wife or his father of his intentions. He attained the ranks of 3rd dan in 1968 and 4th dan in 1972. 

At some point after 1968, Chong established his own dojo, which was not registered with the Singapore Karate Association. Chong had attained 5th dan by 1975, and was at that rank until at least 1979. Chong was responsible for training Inamullah Khan, pioneer of Kyokushin karate in Pakistan.

In 1988, Chong received the Pingat Bakti Masyarakat (Public Service Medal) from Ong Teng Cheong, then Deputy Prime Minister of Singapore, for services to the martial arts. Chong is currently ranked 9th dan in Kyokushin karate, and was promoted to that rank in April 2019.

Personal life
Chong is a Roman Catholic.

Chong has two sons who are also Kyokushin karate practitioners: Jackie, 6th dan, and James, 4th dan.

References

External links
 International Karate Alliance KyokushinRyu

 

Living people
1941 births
Karate coaches
Singaporean male karateka
Singaporean people of Chinese descent
Kyokushin kaikan practitioners